Wickham is a civil parish in Queens County, New Brunswick, Canada.

For governance purposes it is divided between the village of Cambridge-Narrows and the local service district of the parish of Wickham, both of which are members of Regional Service Commission 8 (RSC8).

Origin of name
The parish may have been named for Wickham, Hampshire, near the birthplace of William Spry. Among Spry's numerous pre-Loyalist grants was one of 3000 acres in the Wickham area in 1774.

History
Wickham was erected in 1786 as one of the county's original parish. The parish surrounded Washademoak Lake and extended past the county line.

In 1839 the northeastern part of Wickham was erected as Johnston Parish.

In 1852 part of Wickham was included in the newly erected Cambridge Parish.

In 1895 the eastern half of Long Island was transferred from Hampstead Parish.

Boundaries
Wickham Parish is bounded:

on the east by a line beginning on Washademoak lake at the end of Watson Road in Cambridge-Narrows, then running southeasterly along Watson Road and Route 695 to the Kings County line;
on the southeast by the Kings County line;
on the west by the Saint John River;
on the northwest by Washademoak Lake;
including Hog Island, Killaboy Island, Lower Musquash Island, and the eastern half of Long Island.

Communities
Communities at least partly within the parish; bold indicates an incorporated municipality

 Belyeas Cove
 Big Cove
 Cambridge-Narrows
 Carpenter
 Crafts Cove
 Henderson Settlement
 London Settlement
 MacDonalds Point
 Shannon
 Wickham

Bodies of water
Bodies of water at least partly in the parish:

 Saint John River
 Colwells Creek
 Washademoak Creek
 Cranberry Lake
 Long Island Lake
 Musquash Lake
 Washademoak Lake

Islands
Islands in the parish:

 Birch Island
 Hog Island
 Killaboy Island
 Long Island
 Lower Musquash Island
 Pine Island

Other notable places
Parks, historic sites, and other noteworthy places in the parish.
 Hampstead Ferry
 The Bluff

Demographics
Parish population total does not include portion within Cambridge-Narrows

Population
Population trend

Language
Mother tongue (2016)

Access Routes
Highways and numbered routes that run through the parish, including external routes that start or finish at the parish limits:

Highways
None

Principal Routes
None

Secondary Routes:

External Routes:
None

See also
List of parishes in New Brunswick

Notes

References

Local service districts of Queens County, New Brunswick
Parishes of Queens County, New Brunswick